Prince Hoare (1755 – 22 December 1834) was an English painter, dramatist and librettist. "Prince" is a given name, not a royal title.

Life
Hoare was born in Bath, the son of painter William Hoare and his wife. He was named 'Prince' after his father's brother, a sculptor. He studied art from an early age, and became well known as a painter of portraits and historical scenes. His sister Mary Hoare was also a noted painter.

Later in his life, Hoare wrote 20 plays. He also compiled the Memoirs of Granville Sharp (1820), based on the British abolitionist's manuscripts, family documents and material from the African Institution, London.

Selected works
 Indiscretion (1800)

Bibliography
 
Prince Hoare at Art UK

Notes

Further reading

1755 births
1834 deaths
18th-century English painters
19th-century English painters
18th-century English male artists
19th-century English male artists
19th-century English dramatists and playwrights
English male painters
History painters
English portrait painters
Artists from Bath, Somerset
English male dramatists and playwrights
English librettists